Kongsberg Satellite Services AS (KSAT) is a Norwegian-based company. KSAT has the most extensive ground station network globally, and the world's largest ground station for support of polar orbiting satellites located at 78° North - Svalbard, Norway. They are a provider of ground network services and maritime monitoring services

The headquarters is in Tromsø, Norway, with sales offices in Oslo, Stockholm and Denver, Colorado.

KSAT was established in 2002, though its roots may be traced back to 1967 when the Tromsø ground station was inaugurated.

By mid 2021 KSAT had approximately 270 employees.

Sites
The company's global ground network consists of more than 200 antennas at 23 sites worldwide, this provides optimized locations for satellites in polar, inclined and equatorial orbits. Everything is remotely monitored and controlled and from the HQ's network operations center in Tromsø. 

 Troll, Antarctic
 Cordoba, Argentina (partner station)
 Tolhuin, Argentina (partner station)
 Inuvik, Northwest Territories, Canada
 Punta Arenas, Chile
 Nemea, Greece
 Nuuk, Greenland
 Bangalore, India (partner station)
 Tokyo, Japan
 Mauritius
 Awarua, New Zealand
 Svalbard, Norway
 Tromsø, Norway
 Vardø, Norway
 Panama
 Azores, Portugal (partner station)
 Singapore
 Hartebeesthoek, South Africa
 Puertollano, Spain
 Dubai, United Arab Emirates
 Fairbanks, Alaska, United States
 Los Angeles, California, United States
 Hawaii, United States

Ownership
KSAT is owned equally (50/50) by Space Norway AS (50%), and Kongsberg Defence & Aerospace AS (50%).

References

External links
 Official Kongsberg Satellite Services website

Telecommunications companies of Norway
Earth stations in Norway
Space program of Norway
Companies based in Tromsø
Telecommunications companies established in 2002
2002 establishments in Norway
Satellite